Salehurst and Robertsbridge is a civil parish in the Rother district, in the county of East Sussex, England. The parish lies entirely within an Area of Outstanding Natural Beauty (AONB).

The parish includes the villages of Robertsbridge, Salehurst and Northbridge Street.

On 1 April 2000 the parish was renamed from "Salehurst" to "Salehurst & Robertsbridge".

Governance
Salehurst and Robertsbridge are part of the electoral ward called Salehurst. The population of this ward at the 2011 Census was 4,602

References

External links
 Salehurst and Robertsbridge Parish Council
 (Unofficial) Salehurst and Robertsbridge Website

Civil parishes in East Sussex
Rother District